The 1930 All-Ireland Junior Hurling Championship was the 13th staging of the All-Ireland Junior Championship since its establishment by the Gaelic Athletic Association in 1912.

Offaly entered the championship as the defending champions.

The All-Ireland final was played on 23 November 1930 at Waterford Sportsfield, between Tipperary and Kilkenny, in what was their first meeting in a final since 1928. Tipperary won the match by 8-06 to 3-02 to claim their fifth championship title overall and a first title since 1926. Having earlier claimed the senior and minor titles, Tipperary became the first team to win the so called "Triple Crown" of hurling.

Results

All-Ireland Junior Hurling Championship

All-Ireland quarter-final

All-Ireland semi-finals

All-Ireland final

References

Junior
All-Ireland Junior Hurling Championship